Trefzger is a German surname that belongs to a category of surnames that firstly originated as nicknames and were later assumed as hereditary surnames. The origin of this nickname is thought to lie in the Middle High German term "trefs", referring to a bramble, or a similar type of plant. One possible origin takes into account that the particular plant "trefs" referred to was nearly impossible to kill, therefore, in context of a person, a "trefs" would be someone who is very hardy and lives a long life.

Early Trefzgers 

Amongst early bearers of a variant of the surname Trefzger, a reference to "der (the) Trefs" of Hundgersingen near Riedlingen is dated on the year 1318.  In 1389, a man by the name of Kunrad Treffesese was a church usherer in the town of Fauterbach.

Trefzgers in Wehr 
Most Trefzgers that have not yet emigrated to the US reside in the town of Wehr, Germany.  In Wehr, the Trefzger family had a leading role in public life. Five Trefzgers were appointed ‘Vogte’, which means the old kind of landlord-mayor under the umbrella government of a King or a Duke, and later, two Trefzgers were elected ‘Burgermeister’, or mayor:

Landlord-Mayor

Fridlin Trefzger (1699-1707) 
Josef Trefzger (1754) 
Michael Trefzger (1787-1791)
Johann Baptist Trefzger (1806/08) 
Anton Trefzger (till 1820)

Mayor

Johann Baptist Trefzger (1882-1884)*
Adam Trefzger (1885-1909)

Strife in Wehr 

In the beginning of the 19th century there were 19 families with the name Trefzger in Wehr. The Trefzger family was the second largest in Wehr. In 1833, the law changed for servants, from being owned by landlords to now having a chance to buy their way out and be independent. In 1834, a commission of the mayor Berger and his council members (one of them was a Trefzger) worked out a plan for this matter. There was a problem, however, with Martin Trefzger. He was a teacher, city council secretary and one of the twelve landowners who had to be paid off accordingly. He and another landlord disagreed about how much the city should pay them at this buy-out. The fight between Trefzger and the commission came finally to an end in 1840. Enkendorf, part of Wehr, tried to secede from Wehr. Enkendorf claimed to have enough citizens (90) to receive its independence from Wehr (410 citizens). Against the independence of Enkendorf was the city council of Wehr, with members like Sebastian Trefzger and Karl Berger, as lawyers, and the scriptor (secretary) of law, Martin Trefzger. Revolution in 1848 in Wehr: In 1847, the movement to create a republic in Baden began to increase dramatically. The idea started in France based on the July Revolution in 1830 against Napoleon III. The government of Baden started, therefore, in 1848, a citizen patrol to calm this political movement down. Two of the leaders of the movement were Frans Joseph Trefzger and Hecker. The radicals declared a ‘German Republic’ on September 21, 1848. Many citizens, and finally the Prussian army troupes, fought against the radicals. So did Wolfgang Trefzger, who belonged to
the mayor's council. Frans Joseph Trefzger and his movement finally gave up in May, 1849. Some political activists emigrated to Switzerland and to America.

The Trefzgers in the World Wars 

Died in World War I:

Trefzger, Alois            1894-1915
Trefzger, August 1887 – 1914
Trefzger, Emil             1896-1916
Trefzger, Franz Josef      1896-1917
Trefzger, Julius           1895-1915
Trefzger, Theodor Philipp  1898–1918
Died in World War II:
Trefzger, Emst             1917-1945 (seriously wounded)
Trefzger, Gustav           1911-1942 
Trefzger, Hermann          1924-1945 
Trefzger, Hermann          1916-1940   
Trefzger, Karl Friedrich   1919-1943 
Trefzger, Otto             1918-1944 (never found)
Trefzger, Otto             1918-1943 
Trefzger, Robert           1925-1944 (never found) 
Trefzger, Siegfried        1914-1940 
Trefzger, Walter           1925-1944 
Trefzger, Wolfgang         1913-1941

Notes 

Surnames